La Frontera (Spanish for "the border") is a municipality in the northwestern part of the island El Hierro, Santa Cruz de Tenerife, Canary Islands, Spain. In 2007, the southern part of the territory of La Frontera was split off to form the new municipality of El Pinar.

Sites of interest 
 Punta de la Orchilla – the lighthouse west of the municipality; after building taken to be the prime meridian, being the westernmost point of the known world – identified with the island at large by Ptolemy in the 2nd century AD. It was taken as one of two prime meridians by Richelieu and hence scientists and cartographers under Louis XIII of France in 1634. Many 16th and 17th century international maps noted a co- or nominal only prime meridian here, among other contenders such as Rome or Paris. In 1884 the International Meridian Conference agreed to use the meridian of the Greenwich Royal Observatory as the standard prime meridian, which institution had carried out major work on the studies of longitude. Between these years the island bore an alternate name equally used, Isla del Meridiano (Meridian Island).

 La Dehesa - the hermitage of the Virgen de los Reyes, patron saint of the island whose feast day is 24 September, the statue of which is celebrated in a procession across every settlement of the island every four years on the first Saturday of July, examples being 2001, 2021 etc.

Historical population

See also 
 List of municipalities in Santa Cruz de Tenerife
 Pico de Malpaso

References

External links 

 
 General information El Hierro

Municipalities in El Hierro